Kohneh Gurab or Kohneh Goorab may refer to:
 Kohneh Gurab, Amlash
 Kohneh Gurab, Fuman